Pokonyan! is a 1993–1996 anime series produced by NHK. There are 170 episodes, each 10 minutes long. It is licensed by Enoki Films as Rocky Rackat!.

Pokonyan! was very popular in the 1990s, when there was a tanuki trend.

Characters
 Pokonyan / Rocky Rackat: A mix between a cat and a raccoon.
 Miki Konoha ( Konoha Miki) / Amy: A young girl who is Pokonyan's friend.
 Midori Konoha ( Konoha Midori): Miki's mother
 Shigeru Konoha ( Konoha Shigeru): Miki's father

References

External links
 ROCKY RACKAT! at Enoki Films
 

1993 anime television series debuts
Animated television series about cats
NHK original programming
Television series about raccoons
Television series about shapeshifting